Mark David Canha (born February 15, 1989) is an American professional baseball outfielder and first baseman for the New York Mets of Major League Baseball (MLB). He previously played in MLB for the Oakland Athletics. Canha made his MLB debut in 2015.

Career

Amateur career
Canha attended Bellarmine College Preparatory in San Jose, California. In 2007, his senior year, he batted .440 with 11 home runs. After graduating from high school, he attended the University of California, Berkeley, where he played college baseball for the California Golden Bears baseball team. In 2009, he played collegiate summer baseball with the Brewster Whitecaps of the Cape Cod Baseball League. In 2010, his junior season, he hit .319 with ten home runs and 69 runs batted in (RBIs) in 54 games.

Miami Marlins
After the season, the Florida Marlins selected Canha in the seventh round of the 2010 MLB draft. In 2014, Canha played for the New Orleans Zephyrs of the Class AAA Pacific Coast League (PCL).

Oakland Athletics

The Colorado Rockies chose Canha in the 2014 Rule 5 draft from the Marlins, and then traded him to the Athletics for Austin House. During spring training in 2015, Canha led the Athletics in home runs, but led all major league players in strikeouts. Due to the team's need for a power hitter following the offseason trades of Josh Donaldson and Brandon Moss, Canha made the Athletics' Opening Day roster. In his major league debut, on April 8, Canha had three hits and four RBIs. Canha remained with the Athletics throughout the 2015 season, and led all American League rookies in RBIs. He finished the season with 16 home runs and 70 RBIs, while playing multiple positions for the A's.

Canha underwent season-ending hip surgery after only 16 games with Oakland in 2016. Returning in 2017, he played six games with the A's before being optioned to the Nashville Sounds of the PCL on April 15. On November 8, 2017, Canha underwent right wrist surgery to remove a cyst.

In 2018, Canha hit a career-high 17 home runs with 52 RBIs and a .249/.328/.449 batting line. In 2019, Canha set career highs in average (.273), home runs (26), runs (80) and walks (67) in 126 games. In 2020, Canha slashed .246/.387/.408 with 5 home runs and 33 RBIs in 191 at-bats for the club.

On May 2, 2021, Canha was hit by a pitch for the 60th time in his career, most all-time in the Oakland history of the Athletics franchise. In 2021 he tied for the major league lead in hit by pitches, with 27. After the season, Canha became a free agent and the Athletics did not make an $18.4 million qualifying offer. During his time at Oakland, Canha recorded 645 appearances and recorded a .244 batting average, a .344 on-base percentage and a .431 slugging percentage. He hit 89 home runs and drove in 294 runs.

New York Mets
On November 30, 2021, Canha signed with the New York Mets on a two-year deal worth $26.5 million, with an option for a third year. Canha said he signed with the Mets because he "was ready for the big stage and New York's a big stage" and he wanted "to show the world what [he] can do." On April 15, 2022, Canha was placed on the COVID-19 injured list. He returned five days later on April 20, 2022.

In 2022, Canha led the majors in hit by pitch (28), and batted .266/.367/.403 with 13 home runs in 462 at bats.

Personal life
Canha's wife, Marci, is an architect originally from San Jose. They live in San Francisco during the season and spend their offseasons in Arizona. Canha is of Portuguese heritage.

Canha is also a foodie , he loves trying new places and new types of food. Canha has described himself as a liberal and an ardent supporter of LGBT rights.

See also
Rule 5 draft results

References

External links

1989 births
Living people
Baseball players from San Jose, California
Major League Baseball first basemen
Major League Baseball outfielders
Oakland Athletics players
New York Mets players
California Golden Bears baseball players
Gulf Coast Marlins players
Jamestown Jammers players
Greensboro Grasshoppers players
Jupiter Hammerheads players
Jacksonville Suns players
New Orleans Zephyrs players
Nashville Sounds players
Brewster Whitecaps players
American people of Portuguese descent
St. Cloud River Bats players
Bellarmine College Preparatory alumni